English Strait is the 10.5-mile (17-km) long and 1.2-mile (2-km) wide strait lying between Greenwich Island and Robert Island in the South Shetland Islands, Antarctica.  Trending southeast-northwest, and entered between Santa Cruz Point and Edwards Point in the south, and Fort William Point and Okol Rocks, Aitcho Islands in the north.  The name dates back to 1822 and is established in international usage.

Location

British mapping in 1821, 1822 and 1968, Chilean in 1971, Argentine in 1980, and Bulgarian in 2009.

Map

L.L. Ivanov. Antarctica: Livingston Island and Greenwich, Robert, Snow and Smith Islands. Scale 1:120000 topographic map. Troyan: Manfred Wörner Foundation, 2010.  (First edition 2009. )

References
 English Strait. SCAR Composite Gazetteer of Antarctica.

Bodies of water of Greenwich Island
Bodies of water of Robert Island
Straits of the South Shetland Islands